Kelly Kultala (August 16, 1958) is a Democratic former member of the Kansas Senate, representing the 5th district from 2009 to 2013.  She also served as the 5th District Commissioner for the government of Wyandotte County/Kansas City from 2001 to 2005.  She has served on the Piper School Board and is a current member of the Wyandotte County Library Board.  She is married with three children. She is a practicing Roman Catholic.

Kultala was selected by state Sen. Tom Holland to be his running mate in the 2010 Kansas gubernatorial election.  Unopposed in the primary, Kultala was the Democratic Party's nominee for Lieutenant Governor of Kansas.

In 2014 she ran against Kevin Yoder in Kansas's 3rd congressional district, losing the election 60% to 40%.

Previous committee assignments
Kultala served on these legislative committees:
 Local Government
 Transportation
 Ethics and Elections
 Joint Committee on Home and Community Based Services Oversight
 Joint Committee on Special Claims Against the State
 Joint Committee on State-Tribal Relations
 Ways and Means

Sponsored legislation
Kultala co-sponsored a bill regarding elections and an election commissioner as well as various other Senate bills.

References

External links
Kansas Senate
Project Vote Smart profile
 Kelly Kultala on the Kansas Democratic Party website

Democratic Party Kansas state senators
Living people
American Roman Catholics
Women state legislators in Kansas
1958 births
University of Kansas alumni
21st-century American women politicians
21st-century American politicians